Isoton is a telecommunications company that is headquartered in Australia, with international offices in Singapore and Indonesia. Isoton primarily specializes in developing and managing carrier network software and systems.

References

External links 

Telecommunications companies established in 1988
Companies based in Adelaide
Telecommunications companies of Australia